George W. Chinnock was a Republican member of the Wisconsin State Assembly.

Biography
Chinnock was born on December 1, 1841 in England. During the American Civil War, he served with the 37th Wisconsin Volunteer Infantry Regiment of the Union Army, achieving the rank of first sergeant. He died in 1925.

Political career
Chinnock was elected to the Assembly in 1890. Additionally, he was Chairman (similar to Mayor), Treasurer and Assessor of the town of Troy.

His brother, John A. Chinnock, was also Chairman of Troy and a member of the Assembly.

References

English emigrants to the United States
19th-century English people
People from Hudson, Wisconsin
People from River Falls, Wisconsin
Republican Party members of the Wisconsin State Assembly
Mayors of places in Wisconsin
City and town treasurers in the United States
People of Wisconsin in the American Civil War
Union Army soldiers
1841 births
1925 deaths
Burials in Wisconsin
Place of birth missing
People from St. Croix County, Wisconsin